Budury Lagoon is a small salty lagoon in the Tuzly Lagoons group in Tatarbunary Raion of Odessa Oblast, Ukraine. It is located north from the Shahany Lagoon.It is separated from the Shahany Lagoon by the sandbar.

Named after the old name of the Village of Kochkuvate (old name - Budury).

The water body is included to the Tuzly Lagoons National Nature Park.

Sources
 Starushenko L.I., Bushuyev S.G. (2001) Prichernomorskiye limany Odeschiny i ih rybohoziaystvennoye znacheniye. Astroprint, Odessa, 151 pp. 

Tuzly Lagoons